D/Vision Pro was one of the earliest Non-linear editing systems that was marketed. It was released by TouchVision Systems, Inc. in the mid-1990s.

The Program was DOS based and worked on either the 386 or 486 Intel processors. The system used the AVI compression system and worked on an Action Media II board.

The system allowed users to digitize video, audio and time code, create an editing EDL, instantly play back the edited program and out put the finished EDL in a wide variety of formats.

These systems were used as a cost-effective editing choice by numerous independent filmmakers and low budget productions during the mid-late 1990s.

Low quality compression led TouchVision (later renamed D/Vision Systems) to abandon this system in favor of the D/Vision Online program, which later became Discreet Logic Edit*.

This was after it was purchased by Discreet. Eventually Discreet Killed off Edit* as they did not want it to interfere with Smoke* Sales which were more profitable.

Later Discreet was purchased by Autodesk.

References

Film and video technology
Video editing software